The Gladstone Memorial on the Strand, London is a bronze sculpture of the British statesman, created by Hamo Thornycroft between 1899-1905. The statue was erected as the national memorial to Gladstone and shows him in the robes of the Chancellor of the Exchequer. The figure stands on a plinth surrounded by allegorical figures depicting four of the Virtues, Courage, Brotherhood, Education and Aspiration. The memorial is a Grade II listed structure.

History
William Ewart Gladstone (1809-1898) served four terms as Prime Minister of the United Kingdom between 1868 and 1894. One of outstanding political figures of Victorian England, he sought to reform the electoral franchise through the Representation of the People Act 1884 and the introduction of secret ballots; pursued free trade and attempted to "pacify Ireland" through Home Rule. Although personally opposed to imperial expansion, his terms of office saw major foreign engagements including the death of General Gordon at Khartoum, the Mahdist War and the outbreak of the First Boer War.

Following Gladstone’s death in 1898, a committee was established to raise funds for a national memorial. The commission was given to Hamo Thornycroft. Born into a family of sculptors, by the 1880s Thornycroft had established his own reputation as a distinguished artist. He had already received commissions for commemorative sculptures around Westminster, including statues of Oliver Cromwell, outside the House of Commons, and General Gordon in Trafalgar Square. The commission took Thornycroft six years and the statue was not finally unveiled until 1906. The unveiling ceremony was conducted by John Morley, a member of Gladstone's Cabinets and his biographer. The cost was £8,000.

Reception
The critic Edmund Gosse wrote to congratulate Thornycroft after the memorial's completion; "It is so dignified, so solid and the head so magnificent,; you have got that look of frenzy in the eye that all his best portraits have". Simon Bradley, in the 2003 revised version London 6: Westminster of the Pevsner Buildings of England series, describes the statue as a "fine, robed figure". The sculpture is a Grade II listed structure.

Description
It stands on a plinth of Portland stone by John Lee. Gladstone is depicted in the robes of the Chancellor of the Exchequer. An inscription on the front of the plinth reads "GLADSTONE 1809-1898". Allegorical statues of women, mostly with children, surround the base, representing four of the Virtues, Courage, Brotherhood, Education and Aspiration.

Setting
The memorial stands at the east end of the Strand, in front of the Church of St Clement Danes. It was originally encircled by the roadway, but is now in a pedestrianised plaza. The plaza also has late-20th century sculptures of Air Chief Marshal Hugh Dowding, and Marshall of the Royal Air Force Arthur Harris, St Clement's being the Royal Air Force church.

Footnotes

References

Sources

External links
 The Victorian Web entry for the memorial

William Ewart Gladstone
1905 sculptures
Bronze sculptures in the City of Westminster
Cultural infrastructure completed in 1905
Gladstone, William Ewart
Grade II listed monuments and memorials
Monuments and memorials in London
Outdoor sculptures in London
Gladstone, William Ewart
1905 in London